Arantxa Sánchez Vicario was the defending champion and won in the final 5–7, 6–0, 6–2 against Iva Majoli.

Seeds
A champion seed is indicated in bold text while text in italics indicates the round in which that seed was eliminated. The top four seeds received a bye to the second round.

  Arantxa Sánchez Vicario (champion)
  Iva Majoli (final)
  Julie Halard (second round)
  Amanda Coetzer (semifinals)
  Inés Gorrochategui (quarterfinals)
  Nathalie Tauziat (quarterfinals)
  Ann Grossman (quarterfinals)
  Ruxandra Dragomir (quarterfinals)

Draw

Final

Section 1

Section 2

External links
 1995 Ford International Championships of Spain Draw

Singles